Terry Moore (born 6 August 1951) is a former Australian rules footballer who played with North Melbourne and Hawthorn in the Victorian Football League (VFL).

Moore, originally from Nuriootpa, started his career in 1968 at South Australian National Football League (SANFL) club Central District and represented South Australia at the 1972 Perth Carnival.  After standing out of the game in 1975 while he awaited a clearance, Moore joined North Melbourne in 1976 and was centre half forward in their Grand Final losing team that year. He played one further season at North Melbourne before crossing to Hawthorn.

Personal life
Terry had two sons: Josh, who was a contestant on the ninth season of Big Brother Australia, and Toby, whose death in 2012 prompted Josh to leave the show.

References

Holmesby, Russell and Main, Jim (2007). The Encyclopedia of AFL Footballers. 7th ed. Melbourne: Bas Publishing.

1951 births
Living people
Australian rules footballers from South Australia
North Melbourne Football Club players
Hawthorn Football Club players
Central District Football Club players
People from Nuriootpa, South Australia